The 2013 Challenger ATP de Salinas Diario Expreso was a professional tennis tournament played on clay courts. It was the 18th edition of the tournament which was part of the 2013 ATP Challenger Tour. It took place in Salinas, Ecuador between February 25 and March 3, 2013.

ATP entrants

Seeds

 Rankings are as of February 18, 2013.

Other entrants
The following players received wildcards into the singles main draw:
  Lucas Dages
  Diego Hidalgo
  Nicolás Massú
  Pere Riba

The following players received entry from the qualifying draw:
  Jean Andersen
  Jozef Kovalík
  Gonzalo Lama
  Stefano Travaglia

Doubles main draw entrants

Seeds

1 Rankings as of February 18, 2013.

Other entrants
The following pairs received wildcards into the doubles main draw:
  Sam Barnett /  Cătălin-Ionuț Gârd
  Lucas Dages /  Nicolás Massú
  Diego Hidalgo /  Agustín Velotti

Champions

Singles

 Alejandro González def.  Renzo Olivo, 4–6, 6–3, 7–6(9–7)

Doubles

  Sergio Galdós /  Marco Trungelliti def.  Jean Andersen /  Izak van der Merwe, 6–4, 6–4

References

External links 
 Official website

Challenger ATP de Salinas Diario Expreso
Challenger ATP de Salinas Diario Expreso

es:Challenger de Salinas
it:Challenger Salinas 2013